is a passenger railway station located in the city of Yawatahama, Ehime Prefecture, Japan. It is operated by JR Shikoku and has the station number "U19".

Lines
Only local trains serve the station. Connections with other services are needed to travel further east of Matsuyama on the line.

Layout
The station, which is unstaffed, consists of two opposed side platforms serving two tracks. Track 2 is a through-track while track 1 is a passing loop. A small station building on the side of track 1 serves as a waiting room. Access to the opposite platform is by means of ramps and a level crossing. Parking is available at the station forecourt.

History
Futaiwa Station was opened on 20 June 1945. At that time, the station was operated by Japanese Government Railways (JGR), later becoming Japanese National Railways (JNR). With the privatization of JNR on 1 April 1987, control of the station passed to JR Shikoku.

Surrounding area
 Yawatahama City Hall Futiwa branch office
 Yawatahama Soiwa Post Office

See also
 List of railway stations in Japan

References

External links
Station timetable

Railway stations in Ehime Prefecture
Railway stations in Japan opened in 1945
Yawatahama, Ehime